HMS Kemerton (M1156) was a  of the Royal Navy, launched on 27 November 1953 and named after the village of Kemerton in Gloucestershire.  She was put 'Operational Reserve' at Hythe from 1956 to 1962, before being sent to the Persian Gulf as part of the 9th Minesweeper Squadron.  She was broken up in 1975 at Poole.

References

External links
Ton Class Association: HMS Kemerton

Ton-class minesweepers of the Royal Navy
Ships built by Harland and Wolff
1953 ships
Cold War minesweepers of the United Kingdom